The Democratic Nationalist Party  (DNP) was a conservative political party in South Korea.

History
The DNP was established on 10 February 1949 as a merger of the Korea Democratic Party and groups that supported Yi Chong-chon (who headed a youth organisation) and Shin Ik-hee (a member of the National Association), with the new party holding 70 of the 200 seats in the Assembly. It supported the creation of a parliamentary republic, and in 1950 proposed a constitutional amendment to this effect, although it was defeated in the Assembly.

In the 1950 parliamentary elections the party received the highest share of the vote, although at 9.8%, it won only 24 of the 210 seats in a parliament dominated by independents. It nominated Yi Si-yeong as its candidate for the 1952 presidential elections; he finished third with 11% of the vote.

The 1954 parliamentary elections saw the party's vote share fall to 7.9% as it was reduced to 15 seats. In 1955 it was succeeded by the Democratic Party.

Election results

President

Vice President

House of Representatives

References

1949 establishments in South Korea
1955 disestablishments in South Korea
Anti-communist parties
Classical liberal parties
Conservative liberal parties
Defunct political parties in South Korea
Democratic parties in South Korea
Korean nationalist parties
Social conservative parties
Political parties disestablished in 1955
Political parties established in 1949